A   is a mirror sacred in Shinto. Some mirrors are enshrined in the main hall of a shrine as a sacred object of the divine spirit, or are placed in front of the deity in a hall of worship. Mirrors in ancient Japan represented truth because they merely reflected what was shown, and were a source of much mystique and reverence. Japanese folklore is rich in stories of life before mirrors were commonplace.

The Yata no Kagami, one of the Three Sacred Treasures, is also one of the sacred mirrors.

Significance 
Spirits are enshrined in divine mirrors as Shintai Mirrors are believed to have been used to reflect sunlight during Sun-Worship creating optical effects

In the Nihon Shoki, Amaterasu tells her grandson, Ninigi-no-Mikoto, "Take this and revere it as if it were myself". 

It's believed a mirror helps a believer see a true image of themselves and their devotion and worshipping the divine within themselves

Ancient Chinese theologians believed the soul to be a circular disk, so the usage of a circular mirror was seen as reflecting this

History of divine mirrors 
It is said that the origin of the divine mirror dates back to China. In China, more ancient divine mirrors have been unearthed than in Japan, and compared to the oldest mirror in Japan, the "Four divine mirrors with a rectangular shape inscribed in the third year of Seiryu," which is dated to 235 A.D., the oldest divine mirror in China is the "," which is an order of magnitude older than Japan, dating from 1600 to 770 B.C. In addition, according to the "wajinden", Himiko, the queen of the Yamatai Kingdom, sent an envoy to Wei and received a hundred bronze mirrors from Wei, suggesting that Japan's divine mirror culture is a cultural import from China.

The divine mirror at Iishi Shrine in Hyogo Prefecture is said to have been introduced by a naturalized celestial spear from Silla. On the other hand, the Ministry of the Imperial Household issued a notice to official national shrines founded after 1895 (28th year of Meiji) that their sacred objects should be divine mirrors.

Types of divine mirrors

Goryo Shintai 
In Shinto shrines and the imperial court, mirrors are often used as Shintai. The regulations state, "The diameter of the mirror shall be 1 shaku for the heavenly deities and emperors, and 7 shaku for the nobles. The name of the deity shall be engraved on the reverse side, a red cord shall be attached to a knob, and it shall be placed in a brocade pouch. The mirror may be wrapped in silk and placed in the hidai, then in the funadai, and then covered with the bedding.

See also 

 Bronze mirror
 Yata no Kagami
 Suda Hachiman Shrine Mirror

Bibliography 

 "Usa Hachiman and the Mysteries of Ancient divine mirrors" (Author: Enzumi Tamura, Haruhiko Kimura, Yutaka Momosaka Edition: Ebisu Kosho Shuppan)

References

External links 

 Kagami Art Museum

Shinbutsu shūgō
Buddhist ritual implements
Shinto
Shinto religious objects
Mirrors
Bronze mirrors